Sackville Reach Aboriginal Reserve was located on the Hawkesbury River near Windsor in New South Wales, established in 1889 by the NSW Aborigines Protection Board. The government of the colony of New South Wales gazetted and revoked land for this community in the Parish of Meehan, County of Cook gazetting AR 23,957 (25 March 1896 - 15 December 1900),  AR 23,958 (25 March 1896 – 17 May 1946) and AR 28,546 (26 November 1898 – 17 May 1946).

The reserve was operated under the Aborigines Protection Board (1889–1940) and the Aborigines Welfare Board from 1940-1946.

The two main families on the reserve were the Everinghams and  Barbers.  Andrew Barber, the son of John Barber, a Dharug  man, and his  wife  Ballandella, a Wiradjari woman, was the last resident at the Reserve.

Several missionaries in charge supervised the Reserve including Retta Dixon (1901–1903), Maud Oldrey (1903- ), Annie Lock, Emily Buttsworth (1906-) until the Protection  Board ruled in 1910 that female missionaries could not live alone on reserves.

An obelisk memorial at the site of the reserve was established by Percy Gledhill and is inscribed ‘To the Aborigines  of  the  Hawkesbury  for  whom  this  area  was  originally  reserved’.

See also 
List of Aboriginal Reserves in New South Wales

References 

History of Indigenous Australians
History of New South Wales